Najeh Rahim  (born 27 September 1959) is a former Iraqi football forward who played for Iraq in the 1985 Arab Nations Cup and 1985 Pan Arab Games.

Najeh played for the national team in 1985.

References

Iraqi footballers
Iraq international footballers
Living people
Association football forwards
1959 births